Tanatswa Pfende, known professionally as So Sus, is a Canadian electronic music producer from Vancouver, British Columbia, whose 2019 EP Voices was a Juno Award nominee for Dance Recording of the Year at the Juno Awards of 2021.

His song "Not Me" was featured on Monstercat's Compound 2021 compilation, a collaboration with Canadian record label Westwood Recordings.

Discography

Extended plays

Singles

References

Canadian electronic musicians
Black Canadian musicians
Musicians from Vancouver
Monstercat artists
Year of birth missing (living people)
Living people